Steffi Graf defeated Gabriela Sabatini in the final, 6–3, 3–6, 6–1 to win the women's singles tennis title at the 1988 US Open. It was her first US Open singles title and fifth major title overall. With the win, she became the third woman to achieve the calendar Grand Slam, after Maureen Connolly and Margaret Court. Moreover, it was the fourth component of her calendar Golden Slam, which remains the only calendar Golden Slam achieved in tennis, men or women. It was Sabatini's maiden major final.

Martina Navratilova was the two-time defending champion, but was defeated in the quarterfinals by Zina Garrison.

This was the first US Open final not to have an American woman in 15 years, since 1973.

Seeds

Qualifying

Draw

Finals

Top half

Section 1

Section 2

Section 3

Section 4

Bottom half

Section 5

Section 6

Section 7

Section 8

References

External links
1988 US Open – Women's draws and results at the International Tennis Federation

Women's Singles
US Open (tennis) by year – Women's singles
1988 in women's tennis
1988 in American women's sports